The City of Failing Light is a lost 1916 silent film drama directed by George Terwilliger. It was produced by the Lubin Manufacturing Company.

Cast
Herbert Fortier - John Gray/David Gray
Octavia Handworth - John's wife
William H. Turner - Packard
Leslie Austin - Gray's Secretary (*as Leslie Austen)
Mary Carr - Mrs. Packard (*as Mrs. William Carr)
Dorothy DeWolff - Packard's baby

References

External links
 The City of Failing Light at IMDb.com

1916 films
American silent feature films
Lost American films
Lubin Manufacturing Company films
Films directed by George Terwilliger
American black-and-white films
Silent American drama films
1916 drama films
1916 lost films
Lost drama films
1910s American films
1910s English-language films